Octavio Vial (November 26, 1918 – January 19, 1989) was a Mexican football manager who coached Selección de fútbol de México (Mexico national team) in the 1950 FIFA World Cup. He also coached Atlante, Club América and Club Universidad Nacional, which he promoted as a manager Segunda División to Primera División.

References

1918 births
Mexican football managers
Mexico national football team managers
1950 FIFA World Cup managers
1989 deaths